Folden Township is a township in Otter Tail County, Minnesota. The population was 265 at the time of the 2000 census.

History
Folden Township was organized in 1881, and named after Folden, in Norway.

Geography
The highest elevation in Otter Tail County is found in Folden Township, Section 32, northeast of Urbank.

Demographics
As of the census of 2000, there were 265 people, 112 households, and 81 families living in the township. The population density was 7.7 people per square mile (3.0/km2). There were 151 housing units at an average density of 4.4/sq mi (1.7/km2). The racial makeup of the township was 98.87% White, 0.75% Asian, and 0.38% from two or more races. Hispanic or Latino of any race were 0.38% of the population.

There were 112 households, out of which 22.3% had children under the age of 18 living with them, 67.9% were married couples living together, 2.7% had a female householder with no husband present, and 26.8% were non-families. 22.3% of all households were made up of individuals, and 7.1% had someone living alone who was 65 years of age or older. The average household size was 2.37 and the average family size was 2.79.

In the township the population was spread out, with 17.0% under the age of 18, 4.9% from 18 to 24, 24.2% from 25 to 44, 34.3% from 45 to 64, and 19.6% who were 65 years of age or older. The median age was 47 years. For every 100 females, there were 107.0 males. For every 100 females age 18 and over, there were 122.2 males.

The median income for a household in the township was $38,333, and the median income for a family was $40,250. Males had a median income of $27,250 versus $26,563 for females. The per capita income for the township was $18,252. About 4.6% of families and 6.9% of the population were below the poverty line, including 2.1% of those under the age of eighteen and 4.8% of those 65 or over.

References

Townships in Otter Tail County, Minnesota
Townships in Minnesota